The N-Prize (the "N" stands for "Nanosatellite" or "Negligible Resources".) is an inducement prize contest intended to "encourage creativity, originality and inventiveness in the face of severe odds and impossible financial restrictions" and thus stimulate innovation directed towards obtaining cheap access to space. The competition was launched in 2008 by Cambridge biologist Paul H. Dear, and is intended specifically to spur amateur involvement in spaceflight as it is "aimed at amateurs, enthusiasts, would-be boffins and foolhardy optimists."

Dr. Dear died on 11 March 2020, and the prize was subsequently closed.

The challenge posed by the N-Prize is to launch a satellite weighing between 9.99 and 19.99 grammes into Earth orbit, and to track it for a minimum of nine orbits. Most importantly the launch budget must be under £999.99 including the launch vehicle, all of the required non-reusable launch equipment hardware, and propellant.

In order to be eligible for the awards the challenge initially had to be completed before 19:19:09 (GMT) on 19 September 2013, however later it was decided that the prize will remain open until won. Doing so will earn the winning team a prize of £9,999.99.

List of competing teams
The official site of the N-Prize includes an animated page listing over fifty teams together with contact information and links to any team websites. Examples of teams that have entered the competition at one time or another and who also have or had web pages include:
  Nebula
  Epsilon Vee
  Vulcan
  Microlaunchers
  Cambridge University Spaceflight
  Potent Voyager
  Team Prometheus
  Team 9.99
  Kiwi 2 Space
  Qi Spacecraft
  Aerosplice
  WikiSat

See also
 Ansari X Prize
 Rockoon
 List of space technology awards

References

External links
 N-Prize main website
 N-Prize official forum
 Space Fellowship official N-Prize forum

Challenge awards